Anthony Victor Okungbowa (born c. 1967/1968) is an English-American actor, film producer, and DJ. He was the resident DJ for The Ellen DeGeneres Show from 2003 to 2006 and again from 2008 to 2013 when he was replaced by Stephen "tWitch" Boss. He returned as a guest on April 28, 2014. Since 2019, Okungowa plays Kofo in the CBS sitcom Bob Hearts Abishola.

Early life
Okungbowa is of Nigerian descent and was raised in Nigeria and London. He has a degree in drama from Middlesex University in London. He relocated to the United States in 1992, when he came to do post-graduate work at the Lee Strasberg Theatre and Film Institute in New York City, later moving to Los Angeles in 1998.

Career
The Ellen DeGeneres Show features a DJ to provide musical accompaniment, a role Okungbowa began in 2003 to the end of season three of the show in 2006, when he left to further his acting career.  He was replaced at the beginning of season four by Jon Abrahams. He returned in 2007 for occasional substitute appearances, and returned to DJ full-time for the sixth season which began September 8, 2008. Okungbowa also DJ'd the 2004 Grammy Awards.

His acting roles include guest spots on The X-Files, NYPD Blue, Law & Order: Special Victims Unit and NCIS: Los Angeles in 2014.

He was executive producer of and acted in the film Restless City which had its debut at the Sundance Film Festival in 2011.

As of at least January 7, 2013, Okungbowa had become a naturalized citizen of the United States.

Filmography

Discography

Mixed compilations
2005: Hollywood Sessions, Vol. 1
2009: Total Dance 2009
2012: "A Night to Remember"

References

External links

 
 

1960s births
Living people
American male film actors
American male television actors
African-American DJs
Male actors from London
Black British DJs
Black British male actors
English male film actors
English male television actors
English people of Nigerian descent
The Ellen DeGeneres Show
English emigrants to the United States
Alumni of Middlesex University
21st-century American male actors
Naturalized citizens of the United States
Year of birth missing (living people)